Events from the year 1619 in France

Incumbents
 Monarch – Louis XIII

Events
10 August – Treaty of Angoulême

Births

Paul Hay du Chastelet Jr., military strategist and author (died ca. 1682)
6 March – Cyrano de Bergerac, novelist and playwright, (died 1655)
28 December – Antoine Furetière, scholar and writer (died 1688)

Deaths
12 February – Pierre de Larivey, dramatist (born 1549)
18 June – Martin Fréminet, painter (born 1567)

Full date missing
François d'Amboise, jurist and writer (born 1550)
Jacques Margeret, mercenary captain (born c.1565)
Olivier de Serres, author and soil scientist (born 1539)
François Quesnel, painter (born c.1543)

See also

References

1610s in France